Heneage Finch, 5th Earl of Winchilsea FSA (1657 – 30 September 1726) was an English peer, styled Hon. Heneage Finch until 1712. He was the son of Heneage Finch, 3rd Earl of Winchilsea and Mary Seymour. He was born on 3 January 1657 and baptised on 11 January in the same year.

The Finch family were traditional royalists. At the Restoration, King Charles II recommended Winchelsea to be ambassador to the Porte. He arrived at Constantinople on 17 January 1661. He was eventually recalled by letter on 19 December 1667. He did not leave Turkey until early 1669.

In 1683, he was appointed a Groom of the Bedchamber to the Duke of York and a captain in the Duke's Halberdiers, and was created a D.C.L of Oxford. In 1685, he retained his appointment as Groom of the Bedchamber when York succeeded as James II, was commissioned a colonel, and appointed a deputy lieutenant for Kent. He represented Hythe in James' only Parliament. He lost his posts upon the deposition of James  but remained close friends with his 'brother of the bedchamber' Captain David Lloyd until the latter's death in 1723.

In April 1690, Heneage Finch was arrested and charged with Jacobitism for attempting to join the exiled James II in France. It was a difficult time for Jacobites and Nonjurors (those who had refused to take the oath of allegiance, such as the Finches), as their arrests and punishments were abusive. Because of his arrest, Heneage and his wife Anne Finch remained separated from April until November of that year. Much of her poetry from this period reflects the pain of this period of separation. The charge against him was later dismissed, but Heneage would refer to this period as 'a great escape'.

Finch's work as editor of his wife's poems has yet to be fully studied. Certainly, a significant proportion of the two extant manuscript copies of Anne Finch's work are in Heneage's hand, with further errata noted in his own diaries.

He inherited the earldom from his nephew Charles Finch, 4th Earl of Winchilsea in 1712. He refused to take the Oath of Allegiance and declined his seat in the House of Lords. The titles came with a further cost. The Finches had to assume Charles Finch's financial and legal burdens. Years of trials began in July 1713, with the first being held before Lord Harcourt. The issues were eventually settled in the Finches' favour in 1720, but not before the couple had endured nearly seven years of emotional strain. 

During this period, Heneage and Anne Finch faced renewed strains resulting from court politics. When Queen Anne died in 1714, she was succeeded by George I. Subsequently, a Whig government, which was hostile to the Jacobite cause, rose to power. The Jacobite rebellion, which took place in Scotland in 1715, further aggravated the tense political situation. The Finches became greatly concerned about their safety, especially after a friend, Matthew Prior, who shared their political sympathies, was sent to prison.

Chosen a FSA in 1724, he died in 1726, having suffered from large gallstones and pain for many years. Having had no children by his wife, Anne Kingsmill (1661–1720), he was succeeded by his half-brother John.

References

1657 births
1726 deaths
03
Deputy Lieutenants of Kent
05
Finch, Heneage
Fellows of the Society of Antiquaries of London
Heneage
Alumni of Wye College